The Produce Exchange Building is a historic commercial building at 194–206 Chestnut and 115–125 Lyman Street in downtown Springfield, Massachusetts.  Built in 1899 and remodeled in 1926, it is one of the largest of Springfield's early 20th-century commercial buildings, used for many years as a wholesale produce market.  It was listed on the National Register of Historic Places in 1983.

Description and history
The Produce Exchange Building is located on the north side of downtown Springfield, across Lyman Street from the main railroad line and at the corner of Chestnut Street.  It is an L-shaped four-story masonry structure, finished in brick with terra cotta trim.  It has sixteen-bay facades facing both streets, and a two-bay corner facade housing the main building entrance on the ground floor.  The Chestnut Street facade has five retail storefronts, each with recessed entrances and display windows, separated by pilasters and topped by a frieze band and cornice.  The Lyman Street facade has mostly bricked over retail bays, separated by pilasters.  The upper floor has a combination of sash windows and three-part picture windows, and has a decorated frieze below a simple cornice at the top.

The block was built in 1899 by Andrew Whitney, and began to serve as the city's wholesale produce exchange marketplace in 1908, a role it served for many years.  In 1926 the building was extensively remodeled, including an updated facade, which has survived largely intact.  The building is one of the largest commercial buildings of the period in the city.

See also
Cutler and Porter Block, 109 Lyman Street
National Register of Historic Places listings in Springfield, Massachusetts
National Register of Historic Places listings in Hampden County, Massachusetts

References

Commercial buildings on the National Register of Historic Places in Massachusetts
Buildings and structures in Springfield, Massachusetts
National Register of Historic Places in Springfield, Massachusetts